Ursula Askham Fanthorpe CBE FRSL (22 July 1929 – 28 April 2009) was an English poet, who published as U. A. Fanthorpe. Her poetry comments mainly on social issues.

Life and work
Born in south-east London, Fanthorpe was the daughter of a judge, or as she put it "middle-class but honest parents". She was educated at St Catherine's School, Bramley, in Surrey, and at St Anne's College, Oxford, where she "came to life", receiving a first-class degree in English language and literature. She taught English at Cheltenham Ladies' College for 16 years, but then left teaching for jobs as a secretary, receptionist and hospital clerk in Bristol – in her poems, she later remembered some of the patients for whose records she had been responsible.

Fanthorpe's first volume of poetry, Side Effects (1978), has been said to "unsentimentally recover the invisible lives and voices of psychiatric patients." She was "Writer-in-Residence" at St Martin's College, Lancaster (now the University of Cumbria) in 1983–1985, and later Northern Arts Fellow at Durham Newcastle universities.

Her 1984 volume Voices Off explores student life, critical vocabulary, and the finding that "naming is power". Her most famous poem is probably Atlas, which opens, "There is a kind of love called maintenance."

In 1987 Fanthorpe went freelance, giving readings around the country and occasionally abroad. In 1994 she was nominated for the post of Oxford Professor of Poetry. Her nine collections of poems were published by Peterloo Poets. Her Collected Poems was published in 2005. Many of her poems bring in two voices. In her readings the other voice is that of the Bristol academic and teacher R. V. "Rosie" Bailey, Fanthorpe's life partner of 44 years. The couple co-wrote a collection of poems, From Me To You: love poems, illustrated by Nick Wadley and published in 2007 by Enitharmon. Both became Quakers in the 1980s.

Fanthorpe died of cancer aged 79 on 28 April 2009, in a hospice near her home in Wotton-under-Edge, Gloucestershire.

Awards
Fanthorpe was a Fellow of the Royal Society of Literature, and was appointed Commander of the Order of the British Empire (CBE) in the 2001 New Year Honours for services to literature. In 2003 she received the Queen's Gold Medal for Poetry. Among many other awards and honours she was awarded an Honorary Degree (Doctor of Letters) from the University of Bath.

Bibliography

Four Dogs – a poem, Treovis Press, Liskeard, Cornwall. 1980

From Me To You, Love Poems. U. A. Fanthorpe and R. V. Bailey, London: Enitharmon Press 2007
In a Highland Gift Shop. U. A. Fanthorpe, Edinburgh: Mariscat Press 2013. 

U. A. Fanthorpe: Beginner's Luck, ed. R V Bailey. Bloodaxe, 2019.

References

External links
U. A. Fanthorpe Collection University of Gloucestershire Archives and Special Collections
Fanthorpe reading her own poetry at The Poetry Archive
The British Arts Council's Contemporary Writers page
Article with biographical information from the Independent Online
UA Fanthorpe Daily Telegraph obituary
UA Fanthorpe Obituary in The Guardian
Portraits at the national Portrait Gallery
"Reader's Corner 3: U. A. Fanthorpe & R. V. Bailey" Acumen No 50 – September 2004

Academics of Durham University
Academics of Newcastle University
Alumni of St Anne's College, Oxford
Commanders of the Order of the British Empire
Deaths from cancer in England
English women poets
20th-century English poets
20th-century British poets
Fellows of the Royal Society of Literature
English lesbian writers
People educated at St Catherine's School, Bramley
People from Wotton-under-Edge
People from Kent
People from Surrey
1929 births
2009 deaths
Place of birth missing
English LGBT poets
20th-century English women writers
Cheltenham Ladies' College faculty
British Quakers
English Quakers
Quaker writers